Jérôme Grosset-Janin (born 19 June 1984) is a French rallycross driver from Sallanches, Haute-Savoie.

Biography
Grosset-Janin began his motorsport career in ice racing in 2003, and competed in the 2005 Andros Trophy, where he secured 14 podiums from 14 races. The following year, at age 22, he switched to rallying in the French Asphalt Rally Championship, finishing third to become the youngest driver to win a rally and reach the podium.

In 2009, Grosset-Janin returned to rallycross, finishing third in the French Rallycross Championship in 2010 and 2011. In 2012, he finished runner-up and in 2013 he was crowned French Rallycross Champion. In 2014, he piloted a Clio in the British round of the FIA European Rallycross Championship and finished sixth overall in the heats. In 2015, he raced a full-time campaign in the European Rallycross Championship with Albatec Racing, winning in Belgium on his way to second in the championship behind Tommy Rustad.

Grosset-Janin raced in the World Rallycross Championship for GC Kompetition behind the wheel of a Renault Megane RX. He took his first podium in Sweden 2018.

For the 2019 season, Grosset-Janin entered the TitansRX championship at the wheel of the single-design PanteraRX6 Supercar. He took first place in 2019 TitansRX in Estering, Germany.

This past year, Grosset-Janin has been working alongside Mercedes Benz Etoile Mont Blanc as an ambassador.

Racing record

Complete FIA European Rallycross Championship results

Division 1

Supercar

Complete FIA World Rallycross Championship results

Supercar

References

External links

1989 births
Living people
French racing drivers
European Rallycross Championship drivers
World Rallycross Championship drivers